Kutchi (કચ્છી, ڪڇّی) or Kachhi is an Indo-Aryan language spoken in the Kutch region of India and Sindh region of Pakistan. The name of the language is also transliterated as Katchi, Kutchhi, Kachchi, Kachchhi, Kachhi or Cutchi.

Influences from other languages 
Kutchi is a dialect of Sindhi, with which it is mutually intelligible. Over time, it has borrowed vocabulary from Gujarati.

Most Kutchis living in India are bilingual or trilingual, due to exposure to closely related neighbouring languages such as Gujarati. Many Pakistani Kutchis are also bilingual or trilingual; many residents of Karachi speak Kutchi. 
Its differences from neighbouring languages are more pronounced in its spoken varieties, but it has many loans from Gujarati, Marwari (a major western Rajasthani language) and Hindi-Urdu as well. Major Kutchi-speaking communities include Charans, Jadeja, Bhanushalis, Lohanas, Brahmins (Rajgor), Meghwals, Visa Oswal and Dasa Osval (Oshwal) Jains, followers of Satpanth, Bhatias, Patidar,Rabaris and various Muslim communities in the region, including the Muslim Kutchi Khatris, the Muslim Khojas, the Muslim Rajput-Rayma and Kutchi Memons.

By way of emigration during the British reign many members of Kutchi communities left India / Pakistan and settled in regions of East Africa such as Kenya, Uganda, Zaire/Congo, Tanzania, and even far south as South Africa. The landing point of entry into Africa was in Zanzibar which was a trading post of goods between India and East Africa in the late 1800s. Asians in this region of Africa often adopted Swahili words and phrases into their language, producing a creole language called Kutchi-Swahili.

Common words and phrases 
There are distinct regional accents and variations in grammar. As in many languages spoken along Asian trade routes. Many Kutchi speakers also speak Gujarati as a separate language, especially as it is the language in which Kutchi speakers customarily write. Kutchi speakers' Gujarati accent and usage tends towards standard forms that any Gujarati speaker would be able to understand.

The following words are commonly used by Hindu individuals descending from the Kutch rural area of Gujarat, India, who, especially if in east Africa, reject Kutchi. These are colloquial forms of general Gujarati phrases that are often used in daily conversation in villages, particularly of Kutchi predominance, and are Gujaratisized versions of Kutchi words. Kutchi is also very close to Sindhi and Gujarati due to historical, cultural and geographic influences. These relationships are evident in the following examples:

<small>Note: Bracketed texts indicate nasal or strong Sounds

Writing system 
Kutchi is normally written using a modified version of the Gujarati script. Many books and magazines are published in the language using the modified Gujarati script, including Vadhod ("Inquiry"). In earlier times it was written in Khudabadi and Khojki script, which is now extinct. Dr Rajul Shah, an ayurvedic doctor, psychologist and a graphologist has created a script to use for the language.

There are examples of the Kutchi script in the Kutch Museum, though the script is believed to be now extinct.

Kutchi people

See also 
 Kutchi cinema
 Kutchi Memon
 Memoni language
 Oswal
 Bhatia
 Lohana
 Lohani
 Khojki
 Bhanushali
 Patidar
 Meghwal

Notes

References

External links 

 Kutchi Language Online
 Suvichar Ki Dayri

Languages of Gujarat
Languages of Sindh
Western Indo-Aryan languages
Culture of Kutch